Dürnkrut is a market town in the district of Gänserndorf in the Austrian state of Lower Austria. Castle Dürnkrut (pictured) is the most famous landmark of the town.  The town is agricultural with some noteworthy businesses.  Crops grown in the flatter areas are canola, corn, sunflowers and sugar beets.  The rolling hills are planted with wine grapes by local vintners.

Dürnkrut is located on the March river, which often floods and also forms the border with Slovakia.  The last big flood was in 2006, at which time many houses near to the river were flooded with 2 meters of water.  Dürnkrut is located on the Austrian Railways Nordbahn line.  In former times there was a big sugar factory that made the sugar beets into refined sugar. It was closed down many years ago but some of the buildings are still standing.  The wine street offers many old wines.

The sister town of Waidendorf is located 2 km away, and has even more on.

Subdivisions 

 Dürnkrut
 Waidendorf

Nearby municipalities 
 Gajary
 Götzendorf, Velm-Götzendorf
 Jedenspeigen
 Waidendorf
 Angern an der March
 Zistersdorf

See also 
 Battle on the Marchfeld (also known as "Battle of Dürnkrut")

References

External links 
 

Cities and towns in Gänserndorf District